Cheese soup is a traditional and peasant food from the south of Massif central. Also known as the Aftermath Feast Day Soup, it was brought to the bride and groom's room on their wedding night.

The cheese used to make it is still a subject of controversy between supporters of the laguiole or of the cantal. Celebrated by Alphonse Daudet, in his , this soup has been part of all the local festive meetings (contest, ball, votive party, etc.) for several decades, and every year, the best is distinguished at a world championship.

History and traditions 

This soup, which is part of the hearty dishes of winter.., should not be confused with the french onion soup, so popular with night owls, and on the menu of many restaurants.

Made the old-fashioned way, it had to "miger"  by the fire all day, in a cantou, and she fed a family of peasants after a day’s work. Traditionally, she often used the early morning after the holidays. Currently, it is still used in the afternoons of the party, on the days when it is very cold, at a wedding, in the early morning, when the bride and groom went to bed. A custom of Rouergue is that it is brought to the newlyweds, in their room. It is then served in a chamber pot reserved for this purpose and which has an eye painted at the bottom.

Over the past decade, we have witnessed a revival of cheese soup and the conviviality it implies. It has become common to propose it at associative meetings, contests (petanque, belote), balls, votive festival and we do not fail to recall that from the month of November, it is to be enjoyed with the wine nouveau.

In addition, since 2008, the commune of Viane organizes every year, at the beginning of spring, the world championship of cheese soup.

Cantal or Laguiole 
If in this soup, everyone agrees to proclaim that onions are essential, it has never been decided on the origin of the cheese to be used, namely laguiole, or cantal. Some swear by the laguiole, for others, it is unthinkable to use a cheese other than the cantal. Rare are those who, abandoning the parochial spirit, encourage to use grated gruyere in which will have been mixed laguiole or cantal.

Ingredients 
It takes onions, grated cheese, stale country bread, or slices of hard bread, dry white wine, butter, flour, pot-au-feu broth, then salt and pepper, Garlic cloves, cabbage leaves, or a tomato can be added to it optionally.

Production 
After browning the minced onions, garlic cloves and cabbage cut into strips in butter, sprinkle with flour and add a chopped tomato, mix and moisten with the white wine, then put the broth, pepper and salt. Let it cook covered,

In a soup pot or large ovenproof dish, bread dips are first distributed, then grated or sliced cheese, layers of bread and a few cabbage leaves are alternated. The operation continues until the dish is filled. You pour the broth; if you mix it with the onions, you get a thicker soup. The top of the soup is covered with grated cheese. Place in the oven and leave to gratin. Some prefer not to gratin and stir before serving,

Cheese soup in literature 
Each paragraph is chanted by a gourmand , and the chapter concludes on.

See also 
 Occitan cuisine and

Notes and references

External links

 
 Les Contes du lundi/La Soupe au fromage

French soups
Cheese soups
Peasant food